Lake Kwaza (born 7 November 1993) is an American bobsledder and sprinter.

Biography 
Kwaza was recruited to the American bobsled team in 2017. She competed in track and field as a sprinter at The University of Iowa from 2012 to 2016 and competed in Olympic trials for the United States in 2016 in the 200m.

During the 2018–19 Bobsleigh World Cup she was paired with three-time Olympic medallist Elana Meyers acting as the brakewoman of a two-women bobsled. Her best performance to date was a gold medal finish at the 2019 Lake Placid event. She took part in the 2019 World Championships in the two-women event but did not finish having completed only four of the five required runs.

She joined the United States Army in 2019 as part of their World Class Athlete Program with the aim of qualifying for the 2022 Winter Olympics.

Lake is currently dating USA Olympic bobsledder Hakeem Abdul-Saboor.

References 

Living people
1993 births
American female bobsledders
Iowa Hawkeyes women's track and field athletes
People from Sycamore, Illinois